İshaklar can refer to:

 İshaklar, Çilimli
 İshaklar, Gülnar